Moreto Moro Cassamá (born 16 February 1998) is a Bissau-Guinean professional footballer who plays as a midfielder for Cypriot First Division club Omonia. He represented Portugal internationally on junior levels, before switching to Guinea-Bissau on senior level.

Club career
On 16 September 2017, Cassamá made his professional debut with Porto B in a 2017–18 LigaPro match against Nacional. On the last day of the winter transfer window, 31 January 2019, he was transferred to Ligue 1 club Reims with a contract until the summer of 2022.

On 23 August 2022, Cassamá joined Cypriot club Omonia on a three-year contract.

International career
Cassamá was selected for the Guinea-Bissau national team for the 2019 Africa Cup of Nations and made his international debut in the last group stage match against Ghana on 2 July 2019, coming in as a substitute in 64th minute for Burá.

References

External links

1998 births
Living people
Sportspeople from Bissau
Association football midfielders
Portuguese footballers
Portugal youth international footballers
Bissau-Guinean footballers
Guinea-Bissau international footballers
Bissau-Guinean emigrants to Portugal
Portuguese sportspeople of Bissau-Guinean descent
Liga Portugal 2 players
Championnat National 2 players
Ligue 1 players
FC Porto B players
Stade de Reims players
AC Omonia players
2019 Africa Cup of Nations players
2021 Africa Cup of Nations players
Bissau-Guinean expatriate footballers
Portuguese expatriate footballers
Expatriate footballers in France
Expatriate footballers in Cyprus
Bissau-Guinean expatriate sportspeople in France
Portuguese expatriate sportspeople in France
Bissau-Guinean expatriate sportspeople in Cyprus